Sharon Hambrook (born March 28, 1963) is a Canadian former world champion and Olympic medalist in synchronized swimming.

Career
Hambrook trained with the Calgary Aquabelles. She won a gold medal with her partner Kelly Kryczka in the women's duet at the 1982 World Aquatics Championships in Guayaquil as well as a gold medal in the team event. She received a silver medal in the women's solo at the 1983 Pan American Games in Caracas. Her most notable success was a silver medal in the women's duet with Kelly Kryczka at the 1984 Summer Olympics in Los Angeles, the first year that the sport was recognized by the Olympics.

Honours
Sharon Hambrook was inducted into the Canadian Olympic Hall of Fame in 1996, and was inducted into the Alberta Sports Hall of Fame in 1988.

References

External links
Canadian Olympic Hall of Fame
Alberta Sports Hall of Fame

1963 births
Living people
Alberta Sports Hall of Fame inductees
Canadian synchronized swimmers
Medalists at the 1984 Summer Olympics
Olympic medalists in synchronized swimming
Olympic silver medalists for Canada
Olympic synchronized swimmers of Canada
Pan American Games silver medalists for Canada
Pan American Games medalists in synchronized swimming
Swimmers from Calgary
Synchronized swimmers at the 1984 Summer Olympics
World Aquatics Championships medalists in synchronised swimming
Synchronized swimmers at the 1983 Pan American Games
Medalists at the 1983 Pan American Games